The Natural Environment Research Council (NERC) is a British research council that supports research, training and knowledge transfer activities in the environmental sciences.

History
NERC began in 1965 when several environmental (mainly geographic) research organisations (including Nature Conservancy which became the Nature Conservancy Council in 1973 and was divided up in 1991) were brought under the one umbrella organisation. When most research councils were re-organised in 1994, it had new responsibilities – Earth observation and science-developed archaeology. Collaboration between research councils increased in 2002 when Research Councils UK was formed.

Chief executives
 Sir Graham Sutton (1965–1970)
 Professor James William Longman Beament (succeeding V. C. Wynne-Edwards FRS) 1978-1981
 Professor John Krebs, Baron Krebs 1994-1999
 Sir John Lawton 1999–2005
 Professor Alan Thorpe 2005–2011
 Dr Steven Wilson (Acting) – 2011–2012
 Professor Duncan Wingham – from 1 January 2012

Organisational structure
The council's head office is at Polaris House in Swindon, alongside the other six Research Councils. NERC's research centres provide leadership to the UK environmental science community and play significant and influential roles in international science collaborations.

It also supports a number of collaborative centres of excellence and subject-based designated Environmental Data Centres for the storage and distribution of environmental data.

Mission
The Natural Environment Research Council delivers independent research, survey, training and knowledge transfer in the environmental sciences, to advance knowledge of planet Earth as a complex, interacting system. The council's work covers the full range of atmospheric, Earth, biological, terrestrial and aquatic sciences, from the deep oceans to the upper atmosphere, and from the geographical poles to the equator.

NERC's mission is to gather and apply knowledge, create understanding and predict the behaviour of the natural environment and its resources, and communicate all aspects of the council's work. The British Meteorological Office is not part of NERC.

NERC Airborne Research Facility

The NERC Airborne Research Facility (ARF) collects and processes remotely sensed data for use by the scientific community. Data are collected from one of four Twin Otter research aircraft (or a Dash 7) operated by British Antarctic Survey, processed by a data analysis team at the Plymouth Marine Laboratory and archived at the National Earth Observation Data Centre (NEODC). Currently the NERC ARF provides radiometrically corrected hyperspectral data from the AISA Fenix and Owl instruments; ground height information from the Leica ALS50-II; and digital photography.

See also 

 Conservation biology
 Conservation ethic
 Conservation movement
 David Carson (climatologist)
 Ecology
 Ecology movement
 Environmentalism
 Environmental movement
 Environmental protection
 Habitat conservation
 List of environmental organisations
 Natural environment
 Natural capital
 Natural resource
 Renewable resource
 Royal Research Ship
 Sustainable development
 Sustainability

References

External links 
 
 Centre for Ecology and Hydrology (CEH)
 National Centre for Atmospheric Science (NCAS)
 National Centre for Earth Observation (NCEO)
 ARSF-DAN Wiki

 
Research councils
Environmental organisations based in the United Kingdom
Scientific organisations based in the United Kingdom
Conservation in the United Kingdom
Department for Business, Energy and Industrial Strategy
Non-departmental public bodies of the United Kingdom government
Organisations based in Swindon
Science and technology in the United Kingdom
Environmental organizations established in 1965
1965 establishments in the United Kingdom